Homosassa is a genus of snout moths described by George Duryea Hulst in 1890.

Species
Homosassa blanchardi Shaffer, 1976
Homosassa ella (Hulst, 1887)
Homosassa incudella Shaffer, 1968
Homosassa platella Shaffer, 1968

References

Anerastiini
Pyralidae genera